The 2013 Texas Southern Tigers football team represented Texas Southern University in the 2013 NCAA Division I FCS football season. The Tigers were led by second-year head coach Darrell Asberry and played their home games at a BBVA Compass Stadium, home of the Houston Dynamo. They were a member of the West Division of the Southwestern Athletic Conference (SWAC), but they were ineligible for the SWAC Championship due to NCAA recruiting and academic violations. They finished the season 2–9, 2–7 in SWAC play.

Media
Every Texas Southern football game will be carried live on KTSU 90.9 FM. Select games will be shown live on an ESPN Network or KHOU. Most KHOU games will be shown tape-delayed on Comcast SportsNet Houston.

Schedule

Game summaries

Prairie View A&M

Sources:

Sam Houston State

Sources:

Jackson State

Sources:

Alabama A&M

Sources:

Alabama State

Sources:

Arkansas–Pine Bluff

Sources:

Alcorn State

Sources:

Grambling State

Sources:

Southern

Sources:

Mississippi Valley State

Sources:

Howard

Sources:

References

Texas Southern
Texas Southern Tigers football seasons
Texas Southern Tigers football